Vunadidir/Toma Rural LLG is a local-level government (LLG) of East New Britain Province, Papua New Guinea.

Wards
02. Rabagi No.1
03. Rabagi No.2
05. Rapitok No.1
06. Rapitok No.2
07. Rapitok No.3
08. Rapitok No.4
09. Ratavul
10. Vunakabi
11. Tanaka
12. Taulil No.1 (Taulil language speakers)
13. Taulil No.2 (Taulil language speakers)
14. Vunadidir
15. Bitakapuk No.1
16. Bitakapuk No.2
17. Tagitagi No.1
18. Tagitagi No.2
19. Wariki No.1
20. Wariki No.2
21. Wariki No.3
22. Wariki No.4
23. Viviran No.1
24. Viviran No.2
25. Vunakaur
26. Baie
27. Papalaba
28. Vunararere
29. Tamanairik No.1
30. Tamanairik No.2
31. Rabata
32. Gunanur-Gbone
33. Raim
34. Rapitok

See also
Toma, Papua New Guinea

References

Local-level governments of East New Britain Province